Academy Bus Lines is a bus company in New Jersey providing local bus services in northern New Jersey, line-run services to/from New York City from points in southern and central New Jersey, and contract and charter service in the eastern United States from Boston to Miami. In 2014, Academy acquired Go Buses, which currently operates bus service between Boston and Washington, D.C. and in southern Florida. Academy is the third-largest motorcoach operator in the United States and Canada.

Academy's fleet consists of a variety of motor coaches, including MCI D4500 (in the process of being retired), MCI J4500, Van Hool CX35, Van Hool CX45, and Van Hool C2045 motorcoaches, which are used for commuter and charter services. Nova Bus LFS and New Flyer Industries low floor buses are used for university contracts and charters, such as Columbia Transportation. Services operated under contract to New Jersey Transit use NJT-owned (and branded) North American Bus Industries buses.

Routes

Under contract to NJ Transit
Under contract to New Jersey Transit (NJT), Academy Bus operates the following routes. Routes are listed by county. NJT did not renew its contract with Academy following a fraud settlement with Academy.

Current

Former

Other contract operations 
Under contract to Rutgers University, Academy Bus operated the campus shuttles for the New Brunswick and Piscataway campuses under a 10-year contract, until June 30, 2011, after which time First Transit Services, Inc. took over operations of the Rutgers Campus Buses. Academy has filed a lawsuit against the University over the loss of the contract. Despite the loss of shuttle operations, the company continues to provide the chartered bus operations used for tours and other events.

Academy operates Columbia Transportation for Columbia University, using both Columbia-branded transit buses and Academy-branded coaches.

Academy continues to run a separate operation in New York City for New York University and various operations for universities in southern Connecticut and around Boston. Also, Academy Bus operates long-term parking shuttles around Newark Liberty Airport under contract to the Port Authority of New York and New Jersey using Port Authority-owned and branded Orion VII buses.

In January 2014, Academy began operation of the SIM23 and SIM24 (formerly X23 and X24) routes between Manhattan and Staten Island, formerly operated by the now bankrupt Atlantic Express. These routes were subsidized by and operated under contract to the New York City Economic Development Corporation.  Effective January 3, 2022, operations of the two routes transferred to the MTA, with minor changes to the operating times and routing.

As of October 1, 2014, Academy operates the MTA Maryland Commuter Express routes #410, #411, & #420 under contract to and using MTA Maryland owned buses.  The #820 was also awarded by MTA Maryland and began operations on July 1, 2015.

Academy operates shuttle buses for Tri-Rail in Florida and operates various private and public community shuttles on behalf of municipalities and private communities throughout its service area.

Academy operated under contract BestBus, which provides intercity buses between New York and the Washington area. BestBus was acquired by competitor DC Trails.

In 2013, Academy began a contract with the Carolina Hurricanes of the National Hockey League to run shuttles on game days from carrying spectators from local restaurants serving Pepsi to PNC Arena, the team's arena. The buses are free of charge for patrons who purchase Pepsi-branded drinks at partner restaurants.

Academy formerly operated under contract to Bridj, a private, app-based, on-demand transit service, in the Greater Boston area.

Directly controlled commuter routes
Academy Bus provides commuter line run service along several routes from Burlington, Mercer, Middlesex, Monmouth, and Ocean counties in New Jersey.

The full route is shown for each except for branching. Unless otherwise noted, passengers are carried to and from New York only.

NOTES:
Route 9 service via Academy is provided to lower Manhattan only (except for service via Jackson, which is available to midtown Manhattan). Route 9 service to midtown (except Jackson service) is provided on the 139 full-time.
Toms River and Route 549 service via Academy is only provided to lower Manhattan. Toms River service to midtown Manhattan is provided on the 137 line full-time.
All service via the Garden State Parkway (except for Route 9) operates via the Cheesequake park and ride. Shore Points and Parkway Express services also stop at the PNC Bank Arts Center.

Casino line runs
Academy Bus operates several regularly scheduled line services from points in the New York metropolitan area to and from casinos in Atlantic City, Yonkers, and Connecticut, with service to the Port Authority Bus Terminal operated in partnership with Coach USA as a Megabus service, the M25 (buses carry Academy markings).

Go Buses
Academy Bus runs an intercity bus common carrier service under the "Go Buses" brand, servicing the Northeast United States from Boston to Washington, D.C.. Go Buses markets its service with amenities such as free Wi-Fi, electrical outlets, and a free bottle of water upon boarding, along with a frequent rider rewards program.  Offering tickets as low as $5 per one-way trip, Go Buses competes with other low-cost intercity bus services, such as Megabus, BoltBus, and various Chinatown bus lines. Academy Bus acquired Go Buses in 2014.

Corporate structure
Academy Bus, LLC is a limited liability corporation and holding company that owns three operating companies: Academy Lines, LLC, Academy Express, LLC, and No. 22 Hillside Corporation.

Gallery

See also
 Number 22 Hillside LLC/Corp

References

External links

Intercity bus companies of the United States
Surface transportation in Greater New York
Transport companies established in 1968
Bus transportation in New Jersey
Companies based in Hudson County, New Jersey
1968 establishments in New Jersey
Transportation companies based in New Jersey